Gloucester-Hartpury Women's Rugby Football Club is a women's rugby union club based in Gloucester, Gloucestershire, England. They are the unified women's team of Gloucester Rugby and Hartpury University R.F.C. They were founded in 2014 and as of 2017, play in the Premier 15s.

History 
In 2014, Gloucester Rugby and Hartpury College came together to found a women's team to be run under the jurisdiction of Gloucester Rugby to capitalise upon the popularity of women's rugby in the area. Hartpury College already had a women's team competing in the British Universities and Colleges Sport rugby union leagues. In their first year, Gloucester-Hartpury Women only played friendly matches, some of which were at Gloucester Rugby's home ground Kingsholm Stadium, whilst the Rugby Football Union decided which league to place them in. The team originally started with numbers as low as 4 and grew to a much bigger squad. The first captain was Stacy Payne (Hardie) and vice-captain Jessica Morgan. The team won the Junior Cup in their first season.

In 2015, the RFU placed them in National 2 South West. In their first season they finished second in the league. The following season, they were unbeaten.

In 2017, to take advantage of an increase in women's rugby participation following England's victory in the 2014 Women's Rugby World Cup, it was announced that Gloucester-Hartpury Women were awarded a franchise in the new women's top flight, initially known as Women's Super Rugby and now as Premier 15s, as part of a reorganisation of women's rugby in England, despite never competing in the Women's Premiership or Women's Championship and moving up two leagues as a result. This was controversial as, despite the franchises being awarded by an independent body, Gloucester-Hartpury Women were awarded the position in top flight at the expense of Lichfield Ladies who had been competing in the top flight of English women's rugby for 15 years. There was speculation that this was due to geographical considerations.

Current squad
The Gloucester-Hartpury squad for the 2022–23 season is:

Season Summaries  

Gold background denotes championsSilver background denotes runners-upPink background denotes relegated

References 

Women's rugby union teams in England
Sport in Gloucester
Gloucester Rugby
Rugby clubs established in 2014
Hartpury College